The 2019 Saint John's Johnnies football team represented Saint John's University in the 2019 NCAA Division III football season. The Johnnies, led by seventh-year head coach Gary Fasching, were members of the Minnesota Intercollegiate Athletic Conference (MIAC) and played their home games at Clemens Stadium in Collegeville, Minnesota.

Schedule
Saint John's 2019 schedule consisted of 5 home, 4 away, and 1 neutral-site game in the regular season. The Johnnies hosted Gustavus Adolphus, Augsburg, Bethel, Concordia-Moorhead, and Rose-Hulman. The rivalry game against St. Thomas was held at neutral-site Allianz Field in St. Paul.

Players drafted into the NFL

After moving from tight end to offensive tackle, Ben Bartch began to attract attention from NFL scouts for his performance. After the 2019 season, he was invited to take part in the 2020 Senior Bowl, the only Division III player invited. After performing well there and at the NFL combine, Bartch was selected by the Jacksonville Jaguars in the fourth round of the 2020 NFL Draft. He became the first player from Saint John’s to be drafted since 1974.

References

Saint John's
Saint John's Johnnies football seasons
Minnesota Intercollegiate Athletic Conference football champion seasons
Saint John's Johnnies football